Les Enfants Terribles (LET) is a theatre ensemble based out of Chicago, Illinois. They practice the traditional French clowning style of bouffon. They are not to be confused with the UK based theatre company of the same name, also working in physical theatre.

As of 2011, there were 6 ensemble members of LET. All recent graduates of Roosevelt University in Chicago; they are Alex Kyger, Amanda Miller, Christopher Paul Mueller, Scott Ray Merchant, Eric Ryan Swanson, and Casey Kells.

It is believed that the company has disbanded as their website appears on The Internet Archive to have been inactive since 2012, and their website domain taken by another organisation since 2015. Their Twitter profile has also been inactive since 2011

References 
"Enfants Terribles' debut outing is weird enough for senior prom". Chicago Tribune.
"LES ENFANTS TERRIBLES: PROM NIGH". Chicago Critic.

Notes

Theatre companies in Chicago